Turkmenidae is an extinct family of lamprids from the Paleogene of Turkmenistan.  They were small, disk-shaped fish that bore a strong resemblance to their closest living relatives, the opahs.

Turkmene and Danatinia are found in the Thanetian epoch (of the Paleocene) sections of the Danata Formation  of Turkmenistan. Analectis is found in Late Oligocene strata elsewhere in Turkmenistan.  After the extinction of Analectis, Turkmenidae disappears from the fossil record.

References

Further reading 
 K. A. Monsch and A. F. Bannikov. 2011. New taxonomic synopses and revision of the scombroid fishes (Scombroidei, Perciformes), including billfishes, from the Cenozoic of territories of the former USSR. Earth and Environmental Science Transactions of the Royal Society of Edinburgh 102(4):253-300

 
Animal families
Paleocene first appearances
Oligocene extinctions
Paleogene animals of Asia
Paleontology in Turkmenistan